Imeni Dzerzhinskogo or simply Dzerzhinskogo is the name of several rural localities in Russia:
Dzerzhinskogo, a logging depot settlement in Luzhsky District of Leningrad Oblast
Imeni Dzerzhinskogo, Moscow Oblast, a settlement in Mozhaysky District of Moscow Oblast
Imeni Dzerzhinskogo, Nizhny Novgorod Oblast, a settlement in Perevozsky District of Nizhny Novgorod Oblast
Imeni Dzerzhinskogo, Voronezh Oblast, a settlement in Kashirsky District of Voronezh Oblast

See also
Dzerzhinsky (inhabited locality)
Yuzhnogo otdeleniya sovkhoza imeni Dzerzhinskogo, a settlement in Novousmansky District of Voronezh Oblast